Solar Aviation Co.,Ltd., which operated as Solar Air, was a Thai airline based at the Don Mueang International Airport. The airline ceased all operations in 2010.

Destinations
This is a list of destinations that Solar Air flies to:
 No current destinations

Fleet
The airline is not flying and all routes were taken over by Nok Air

References

Defunct airlines of Thailand
Defunct low-cost airlines
Airlines established in 2004
Airlines disestablished in 2010
2010 disestablishments in Thailand
Companies based in Bangkok
Thai companies established in 2004